Sylvester Omodiale (born 5 September 1977) is a Nigerian hurdler. He competed in the men's 400 metres hurdles at the 2000 Summer Olympics.

References

1977 births
Living people
Athletes (track and field) at the 2000 Summer Olympics
Nigerian male hurdlers
Olympic athletes of Nigeria
Place of birth missing (living people)